Athletics was one of the sports at the West Asian Games, and featured on the programme at all three editions of the competition, in 1997, 2002, and 2005. The programme had only men's competitions in the first two editions before introducing women's events in 2005.

Editions

Medal table

References

 
West Asian Games
West Asian Games
Athletics